Jalees Sherwani was an Indian screenwriter and lyricist. His first appearance was in the film "Kanwarlal" with Jeetendra.
He died in 2018.

Filmography
Pratighat (1987) (dialogue)
Kanwarlal (1988) (dialogue)
Hatyare (1989) (dialogue)
Sangram (1993) (dialogue)
Game (1993) (dialogue)
Ishq Mein Jeena Ishq Mein Marna (1994) (dialogue)
Anokha Andaaz (1995) (dialogue / story and screenplay)
Ek Tha Raja (1996) (dialogue)
Mafia (1996) (dialogue)
Loafer (1996) (dialogue)
Bhoot Bhungla (1997)
Mrityudaata (1997) (dialogue)
Hafta Vasuli (1998) (dialogue)
Aakrosh: Cyclone of Anger (1998) (dialogues)
Baaghi (2000) (dialogue)
The Truth... Yathharth 
Tez-New Movie (2002) (dialogue / story and screenplay)
Inteqam: The Perfect Game (2004) (dialogue + lyrics)
Chand Sa Roshan Chehra (2005)
Partner (2007) (lyrics)
Hello (2008) (lyrics)
Dhoondte Reh Jaoge (2009) (lyrics)
Paying Guests (2009) (lyrics)
"Mitti" (2001) (lyrics)
"Kya Yehi Pyar Hai" (2001) (lyrics)
"Tumko Na Bhool Payenge" (lyrics)
"Main Ne Dil Tujhko Diya" (lyrics)
"Mashooka" (lyrics)
"Hum Tumhare Hain Sanam" (lyrics)
"Garv" (lyrics)
 The Killer (lyrics)
 Say Yes to love (lyrics)
" Kuch Kaha Aapne" (lyrics)
"Shadi Karke Phans Gaya" (lyrics)
"Mujh se Shadi Karogi" (lyrics)
"Tere Naam" (lyrics)
"Zindagi Tere Naam (lyrics)
"Heroes" (lyrics)
"Hello Brother" (lyrics)
Wanted (2009) (lyrics)
Main Aurr Mrs Khanna (2009) (lyrics)
Dabangg (2010) (lyrics)
Dabangg 2   (2013) (lyrics)
Chashme Badoor (2013) (lyrics)
Tiger Zinda Hai (2017) (lyrics)

Other Credits 
 2014 - 2016 - President of Film Writers' Association 
 2008-12 - President of Film Writers' Association 
 1990-93 - General Secretary of Film Writers' Association

Social Activist
Jalees Sherwani was also a social activist, he was president of Film Writers' Association and a member of Progressive Foundation, FWA, Press Club of India. He was jury member of many shows.

Accolades

References

External links 
 

20th-century births
2018 deaths
Year of birth unknown
Indian male screenwriters
Indian lyricists
People from Kasganj
Indian people of Pashtun descent
Screenwriters from Uttar Pradesh
Musicians from Uttar Pradesh
20th-century Indian dramatists and playwrights
21st-century Indian dramatists and playwrights
20th-century Indian male writers
21st-century Indian male writers
Place of death missing
Place of birth missing